Jiske Griffioen defeated Yui Kamiji in the final, 6–3, 7–5 to win the women's singles wheelchair tennis title at the 2015 Australian Open.

Sabine Ellerbrock was the defending champion, but was defeated by Kamiji in the semifinals.

Seeds

Draw

References 

General

 Drawsheets on ausopen.com 

Specific

Wheelchair Women's Singles
2015 Women's Singles